Afzal Mehdi Khan (1928–1966) was Pakistani politician from Jhelum. He was a member of the 3rd National Assembly of Pakistan during 1962-65 and a member of the 4th National Assembly of Pakistan during 1965-66. He was father of Pakistani MNA Malik Iqbal Mehdi Khan and MPA Raheela Anwar. Afzal died while in office.

Political career
 In 1962 election, he was elected as member national assembly from NW- 21 (Jhelum- I) constituency.
 In 1965 election, he was elected as member national assembly from NW- 22 (Jhelum-cum-Gujrat) constituency.

References 

Pakistani MNAs 1962–1965
1928 births
1966 deaths